Constantine I (272–337), popularly known as Constantine the Great, was a Roman Emperor.

Constantine I may also refer to:
Constantine I of Greece (d. 1923)
Constantín mac Cináeda (d. 877), also known as Constantine I of Scotland 
Zara Yaqob (1399–1468), emperor of Ethiopia sometimes known as Constantine I

Nobles on the island of Sardinia
Constantine I of Arborea, 11th century ruler in Arborea, on the island of Sardinia
Constantine I of Cagliari, 11th century ruler 

Nobles in the Kingdom of Georgia
Constantine I of Imereti (d. 1327), king of the Imereti in Georgia
Constantine I of Georgia (1369–1412), king of Georgia
Constantine I of Kakheti (1567–1605), aka Constantine Khan, King of the Kakheti in Georgia
Constantine I, Prince of Mukhrani (fl. 1622 – 1667), a royal of the Bagrationi dynasty of Kartli

People in Cilician Armenia
Constantine I, Prince of Armenia (1035–1040), second "Lord of the Mountains" of Cilician Armenia
Constantine I of Cilicia (fl. 1221–1267), Catholicos of the Armenian Apostolic Church
Constantine I, King of Armenia (1278–1310), also sometimes called Constantine III, King of Cilician Armenia (son of Leo II, and brother of Hethum II)

Religious leaders
Patriarch Constantine I of Constantinople
Pope Constantine

See also
Constantine (disambiguation)